West Bend Recreation Area is a South Dakota State Recreation Area located along the shore of Lake Sharpe, a Missouri River Reservoir. The area is located in Hughes County. The park is open for year-round recreation including camping, horseback riding, biking, hiking and cross country skiing.

References

External links
 West Bend Recreation Area - South Dakota Dept. of Game, Fish & Parks
 Lake Sharpe & Big Bend Dam - U.S. Army Corps of Engineers

Protected areas of Hughes County, South Dakota
State parks of South Dakota